Madison Leisle (born June 2, 1999) is an American actress. She is most famous for her recurring role in the television shows, Ghost Whisperer, where she portrayed Julia Miller, and Grey's Anatomy as Lisa the child. She also has a role in the 2010 movie Kill Katie Malone. She has also appeared in a number of independent films and short films.

Personal life
Leisle was born June 2, 1999, and has two brothers who also act, Austin Leisle and Parker Contreras.

Career
Leisle made her debut in the television series The Studio, where she portrayed the 4-year-old version of Kelly Overton's character, Heather Falls. In 2005, she was featured in a television special, Comedy Central's Last Laugh '05. Leisle had a role in the short film, Shades of Grey and the television movie Love's Abiding Joy in 2006. In 2007, she played Lisa the child for two episodes of Grey's Anatomy. Leisle appeared in the television series The Mentalist and Ghost Whisperer in 2009. In 2010, she will be seen in the short film A Fire in a Dovecot and the feature film Kill Katie Malone. She was a series regular on the American television series Are You Smarter Than a 5th Grader?, after joining the class in September 2010.

Filmography

Film

Television

Awards and nominations

External links

1999 births
Living people
American child actresses
21st-century American actresses
American film actresses
American television actresses